Olga Katryna Subeldia Cabrera also known as Katryna Subeldía (born 6 January 1989) is a Paraguayan former track and field athlete, known for winning a Silver Medal at the Under-23 South American Games in 2010, and for finishing 5th at the 2011 South American Championships in Argentina. She was last active in 2015.

International Competitions

National Competitions

Personal bests
 Discus Throw: 43.97m  Asunción – 5 November 2011
 Javelin Throw: 52.27m  Medellín – 23 March 2010

References

External links
 IAAF Profile

1989 births
Living people
Paraguayan javelin throwers
Paraguayan female athletes